The UNSW Solar Racing Team (also known as Sunswift after the name of their first race car) is the solar car racing team of the University of New South Wales in Sydney, Australia. The team currently holds a number of world records and is best known for its participation in the World Solar Challenge (WSC). Since its founding in 1996 by Byron Kennedy, the Sunswift team has built a total of 6 different cars, the most recent of which is Sunswift VI (also known as VIolet).

Sunswift Team

The team primarily consists of undergraduate students from various disciplines including business, engineering and industrial design. Despite its team members being largely engaged in full-time study, Sunswift has remained competitive in all participated solar car challenges, earning prestige and recognition on the world stage as well as training young engineers to be on the cutting edge of their profession. A number of former Sunswift team members have moved on to establishing their own companies and others have attained highly sought-after positions in the workforce; for example, working as part of well-established racing teams such as those in Formula 1. Some of these team members remain in contact with Sunswift even after graduation, and act as mentors or advisors to the newer recruits, thus helping to continue the standard of excellence that has been embodied in the team since its founding in 1996.

Outreach program

The Sunswift team also plays an active role in the local community by educating the general public about the advantages of solar versus conventionally powered vehicles. To this end, they regularly showcase the series of Sunswift cars at exhibitions and hold information days open to the public. In addition, Sunswift also visits schools in order to teach and inspire young children about implementing solar power technology whilst demonstrating how it can be a fun and effective method of powering a car.

How it works

All solar cars have at least 5 main parts to their power system: the solar array, maximum power point tracker (MPPT), battery, motor controller and electric motor. These cars rely on converting the electromagnetic energy of the sun into electrical energy, through the use of photovoltaic cells, and then converting that electrical energy into mechanical energy to drive the car, through the use of some form of electric motor. Maximum power point trackers act as an interface between the solar array and the battery, while motor controllers act as an interface between the battery and the electric motors

As sunlight shines on the solar array, it transfers energy to the electrons within the photovoltaic cells, thus allowing them to conduct electricity and causing a current to flow. This current then travels to the MPPTs which alter the load across the solar array in order to ensure that it is generating electricity as efficiently as possible. The MPPTs have to constantly monitor the output of the photovoltaic cells because that output depends on the light intensity which can change rapidly if some cells become shaded. The electricity then flows into the battery where it can be stored for later use such as to drive the car while there is no sunlight. Although the battery is primarily charged by the solar panels, it can also be externally charged by the conventionally generated electricity at your home or workplace. The battery then discharges the current into the motor controllers which converts it into a form that can be used to power the electric motor. Motor controllers are also used to manage things like speed regulation, cruise control and regenerative braking. Regenerative braking is using the existing motors as generators by converting the rotational energy of the wheels back into electrical energy, slowing the car down and recharging the battery at the same time, instead of just using conventional mechanical brakes. Lastly, the energy that was once in the sunlight shining on the car, reaches the electric motors which operate on the principles of electromagnetism to turn that electrical energy into rotational energy that spins the wheels and drives the car forward.

Sunswift VI (VIolet) (2017 - current)
VIolet is the sixth vehicle designed and manufactured by Sunswift. It is the second vehicle manufactured by Sunswift that is built to compete in the Cruiser Class. Design of VIolet began in 2016 and manufacture was completed in late 2017. In comparison to previous generations of Sunswift vehicles, VIolet is Sunswift's first four-seat, four-door vehicle with a 5-square-metre solar array consisting of 318 monocrystalline silicon cells with an approximate efficiency of 22%. VIolet was designed with a greater focus on practicality, with the aim of resembling a more comfortable family vehicle in comparison to previous generations of Sunswift vehicles. New features have been implemented in VIolet such as live monitoring and fault detection, entertainment systems, air conditioning, navigation, wifi, reverse camera, adjustable seating, parking sensors, front and back boot-space, and ergonomic dashboard. As a result of this, the vehicle competed in the 2017 World Solar Challenge and placed third in practicality.

In December 2018, the team had driven from Perth to set a Guinness World Record for the lowest energy consumption while driving across Australia in an electric car. VIolet was then further tested and refined for reliability and efficiency, leading to an all-time highest Sunswift ranking of 2nd Place Overall in the 2019 Bridgestone World Solar Challenge and finishing first across the line in Adelaide.

Sunswift V (eVe) (2012 - 2016)

The design and construction of eVe began in early 2012 and was completed within 18 months in time for the 2013 World Solar Challenge. The car cost approximately $500,000 and was built to compete in the new Cruiser Class in the WSC. This class focused on more practical solar cars with passenger seats, greater safety and more efficient batteries. To reflect its focus on practicality, the team also designed it to resemble a modern-day sports car, rather than the typical space aged style of most other solar vehicles.

Once fully depleted, the batteries can be completely recharged in 10 hours using a standard household power socket or in under 7 hours using a commercial power socket. In terms of cost and efficiency, for every 100 km the solar car would cost approximately $0.20 compared to the average $15 for conventional petrol powered cars.

In July 2014 The Sunswift team broke an FIA World Record which was overseen by the Confederation of Australian Motorsport, for the fastest electric vehicle capable of travelling  on a single battery charge. This record was not an exclusive Solar car record, but was open to any Electric vehicle weighing under . Consequently, for this record the Solar cells were disconnected from the electrical systems, and the car was allowed to only run on its lithium-ion battery pack.

The team is currently progressing with eVe's road legality status and plans to officially register eVe as Australia's first road legal Solar car. This would make eVe one of the only road legal solar cars in the world and the first to adhere to the strict Australian Design Rules.

Sunswift IV (IVy) (2009 - 2011)
 

As with eVe, IVy was built to compete in the World Solar Challenge, specifically for the 2009 race. However, unlike eVe, IVy raced as part of the Challenger Class and Challenger Class Silicon, ending up finishing 4th overall despite being the first silicon powered car across the line. Overall, the entire project took approximately 18 months and $250,000 to complete. On January 7, 2011, at the Royal Australian Navy airbase, IVy broke the Guinness World Record for the fastest solar powered vehicle. The rules of the record required that IVy be powered solely by the sun and with the entire battery pack removed, the car weighed only .

Sunswift III (2005 - 2008)

Sunswift III was designed for the 2005 WSC. Mechanical problems caused a crash before the race, and the car completed the course unofficially. In 2006, the mechanics were improved. In January 2007, Jaycar Sunswift III broke the world transcontinental record, completing the drive from Perth to Sydney in 5.5 days. In September, the team successfully completed the WSC in ninth place overall, and was also awarded the CSIRO technical innovation award, out of an initial field of 41 international entrants. The same year, the Sunswift team was awarded the 2007 Engineers Australia Engineering Excellence Award for Education and Training.

Sunswift II (1998 - 2005)

Between 1997 and 2003, the team developed, refined and raced four versions of UNSW Sunswift II. In 2000-2001, the team embarked on the TopCell project to manufacture buried contact solar cells to construct a new solar array. This makes the UNSW SRT the first and only team to have made their own solar cells. Along the way, the team achieved a new world record efficiency for this type of solar cell. The remaining cells on UNSW Sunswift II are the world's highest efficiency "PERL" silicon solar cells, made at UNSW. The team also pioneered a cell encapsulation technique which allowed the moulding of solar panels to the curved shape of the car.

Sunswift I (1996)

The original Sunswift vehicle was purchased from the Aurora Vehicle Association in 1996. The car, Aurora Q1, was significantly upgraded and improved by the UNSW SRT and renamed Sunswift, under team leader Byron Kennedy. A new motor and controller, roll cage, chassis and batteries were added. Sunswift I then went on to race in the 1996 World Solar Challenge. The car was still a competitive entry despite its age, placing 9th out of over 46 entries. The experience gained from racing Sunswift I inspired the development of Sunswift II starting in 1997.

Achievements

See also
Solar car racing
List of solar car teams
List of prototype solar-powered cars

References

External links
UNSW Sunswift website
UNSW Sunswift Youtube channel - includes videos of vehicle construction and achievements

Solar car racing
University of New South Wales student organisations